Tuğçe Güder is a Sudanese-born Turkish model who was chosen as the Best Model of Turkey, an international annual competition, in 2005 and represented Turkey at the Best Model of the World modelling pageant.

Tuğçe was born to Sudanese parents, and was adopted as a baby by Turkish parents. She married restaurant owner Uğur Karas in 2008. Among the many charitable works, she is involved in raising awareness for helping neglected children.

References

Turkish female models
Living people
Turkish people of Sudanese descent
Year of birth missing (living people)